Nakouzi is a surname. Notable people with the surname include:

Elie Nakouzi (born 1969), Lebanese television broadcaster and presenter 
Jean Nakouzi (born 1947), Lebanese wrestler
Michel Nakouzi (born 1932), Lebanese wrestler

Arabic-language surnames